Crystal Spring is a spring in northern Beaver County, Utah, United States.

Description
The water produced by the spring flows west-northwest down into the Wah Wah Valley, where is seeps into the ground before reaching any stream.

The spring was so named on account of its crystal clear water.

See also

References

Bodies of water of Beaver County, Utah
Springs of Utah